Jiří Anderle  (born 14 September 1936, in Pavlíkov) is a Czech painter and graphic artist. He was of assimilated German ethnic ancestry  from paternal side.

Career
In 1961 he graduated from the Academy of Fine Arts (painting with Antonín Pelc and graphics with Vladimír Silovský). During 1969-73 he worked as an assistant at the UIA Zdeněk Sklenář and Jiří Trnka.

In dozens of his works, Anderle expresses the human existential anxiety and general timelessness. Recently, his work has moved closer to abstraction.

Anderle has made nearly 100 solo exhibitions throughout the world and his work is represented in some 40 galleries and museums including the New York Metropolitan Museum and Paris's Pompidou Centre.

Awards
In 2006 he was awarded the Medal of Merit (III. degree).

See also
List of Czech painters

References

External links
Official site
Paintings and Biography

1936 births
Living people
People from Rakovník District
20th-century Czech painters
20th-century Czech male artists
Czech male painters
Czech graphic designers
Recipients of Medal of Merit (Czech Republic)
Academy of Fine Arts, Prague alumni